Ars Americana, Ars Politica: Partisan Expression in Contemporary American Literature and Culture is a 2010 critical study by Peter Swirski.

The book examines contemporary American political literature and culture in the context of American politics and history. It examines not only the partisan credentials of what it argues is a new brand of art engagé, but also the "nobrow" style in which it conducts its political business. 

The principal examples of American literature that Swirski discusses in detail are: Irving Wallace’s The Man (1964), Richard Condon’s Death of a Politician (1978), P.J. O’Rourke’s Parliament of Whores (1991; 2003), Warren Beatty’s script and film Bulworth (1998), and Michael Moore’s Stupid White Men... and Other Sorry Excuses for the State of the Nation (2002; 2004). Each is selected because political partisanship is a part of its artistic agenda. As Swirski remarks in the introduction, the political art discussed in Ars Americana “should come equipped with shock-absorbers”.

Nominated for a dozen major awards Howard Zinn touted the work as “fascinating and original”.

References

American political books
2010 non-fiction books